Kraussinidae is a family of brachiopods belonging to the order Terebratulida.

Genera:
 Hillerella Simon, Logan & Mottequin, 2016
 Kraussina Davidson, 1859
 Lenticellaria Simon, Logan & Mottequin, 2016
 Megerella Bitner & Logan, 2016
 Megerlia King, 1850
 Megerlina Deslongchamps, 1884
 Pumilus Atkins, 1958

References

Terebratulida